Caven Atkins (1907 2000) was a Canadian figurative and landscape painter.

Early years
Born in London, Ontario, Caven Atkins was raised in Manitoba and Saskatchewan. From 1925 to 1928 he studied with Lionel LeMoine FitzGerald at the Winnipeg School of Art. After graduation, Atkins worked at Brigden's commercial art firm, where he met Bertram Brooker and Charles Comfort. Atkins later became friends with Fritz Brandtner, who introduced him to German expressionism.

Career
From 1930 to 1934, he was an instructor at the Winnipeg School of Art. He taught painting at Queen’s University summer school in 1943 and at the Ontario College of Art in 1945. Other teaching positions he held included the  appointments at the University of Toronto, Central Technical School and elsewhere. While teaching at the Ontario College of Art in 1945, he wrote an article for Canadian Art magazine on using different media.

Atkins was not selected to be an official war artist, but he was determined to be in the war effort. He recorded day and night scenes of the activity in the Toronto Shipbuilding Company in a painting and 24 drawings he made in 1942. These he donated to the National Gallery of Canada in 1951 (they subsequently became part of the war art collection prior to their transfer to the Canadian War Museum in 1971), where they were acknowledged because of their home front subject matter.

Like many artists, Atkins found employment in the immediate post-war period difficult to find. In 1945, he moved to Birmingham, Michigan where he worked as an illustrator and designer for the Ford Motor Company until he retired. Atkins never returned to live in Canada. He died in Birmingham, Michigan December 22, 2000 at the age of 93.

Selected exhibitions
Atkins had a retrospective of his watercolours at Hart House (now part of the Art Museum of Toronto) in 1945. In 1979, the Art Gallery of Windsor curated a survey by Kenneth Saltmarche, titled A Retrospective Exhibition of Selected Works by Caven Atkins Spanning Fifty Years of the Artist's Life. In 1987, the Art Gallery of Windsor organized the circulating exhibition Caven Atkins : the Winnipeg years curated by Ted Fraser.

Selected collections
His work is included in the National Gallery of Canada, the Canadian War Museum, the Art Gallery of Algoma, the Art Gallery of Ontario, the Art Gallery of Windsor (56 works) the Beaverbrook Art Gallery, Fredericton and the Remai Modern , Saskatoon.

Memberships
Atkins belonged to the Manitoba Society of Artists, the Canadian Group of Painters (1941-1943); Canadian Society of Graphic Art  (1941-1943); and the Canadian Society of Painters in Water Colour (1943-1945) (he was president of the latter two societies). He also belonged to Ontario Association of Teachers of Art (1944-1945).

References

Bibliography
 

1907 births
2000 deaths
Artists from London, Ontario
20th-century Canadian painters
Canadian male painters
20th-century Canadian artists
Canadian watercolourists